Joey Matenga Ashton (3 June 1907–8 November 1993) was a New Zealand  railway worker, sportsman, and dance band leader. Of Moriori and Māori descent, he identified with the Ngati Kahungunu and Ngati Mamoe iwi. He was born in Greytown, Wairarapa, New Zealand on 3 June 1907. He was the son of Te Ao Ahitana Matenga (Joseph Ashton) and Kiti Karaka Riwai.

References

1907 births
1993 deaths
Moriori people
Ngāti Kahungunu people
Kāti Māmoe people
New Zealand Māori musicians
New Zealand railway workers
People from Greytown, New Zealand
People educated at Te Aute College
New Zealand Māori sportspeople